Shumakov is a Russian masculine surname, its feminine counterpart is Shumakova. It may refer to
Aleksey Shumakov (born 1948), Russian wrestler
Marina Shumakova (born 1983), Kazakhstani table tennis player 
Valery Shumakov (1931–2008), Russian surgeon and transplantologist

Russian-language surnames